D.M. Ladd, AKA D. Milton Ladd and "Mickey" Ladd (1903–1960), was a special agent and assistant (number 3 position) at the Federal Bureau of Investigation (FBI) to its director J. Edgar Hoover, who was "one of the earliest members" of the FBI.

Background
Daniel Milton Ladd was born on October 30, 1903, in Fargo, North Dakota. His parents were Edwin Freemont and Rizpah Sprogle.  He attended public school.  In 1921, he moved to Washington, DC, where he attended the George Washington University (GW).  In 1925, he obtained A.B. from GW, where he played basketball and was a member of the District of Columbia Alpha chapter of the Sigma Phi Epsilon fraternity.  In 1928, after several years of night school, he obtained a law degree from GW.

Career

Ladd worked at his father's office initially, then helped run subway cars between US Capitol office buildings.

On November 5, 1925, having finished law school, Ladd joined the FBI as an agent.  His first assignment was in Butte, Montana, followed by New Orleans, Louisiana.  In 1931, he became a special agent, assigned to St. Louis, Missouri; St. Paul, Minnesota; Chicago, Illinois; and Washington, DC, field offices.

In 1939, Ladd became assistant director of the FBI's Technical Laboratory, AKA Identification Division and Laboratory.  In 1941, Ladd became head of the Security Division, which in 1942 became the FBI's Domestic Intelligence Division (in the 21st Century known as "counterintelligence").  In this role, Ladd led investigations into Nazis (e.g., Operation Pastorius) during World War II and into Communists during WWII and the early Cold War including major cases like the Amerasia Case, Hiss-Chambers Case, and Julius and Ethel Rosenberg Case as well as alleged spies Alexander Koral, Robert Talbott Miller, William L. Uanna, Harry Dexter White, and Duncan Chapin Lee Case and even movies stars like Lucille Ball and subjects such as UFOs.

On May 5, 1949, Hoover appointed Ladd to the Number 3 position of Assistant to the Director, succeeding Edward Allen Tamm, as second only to Clyde Tolson.  As Hoover's "assistant," Ladd's role was "supervision of all the FBI's investigative activities in both criminal and subversive fields."

In 1954, Ladd retired from the FBI.

In 1960, Ladd ran for Congress in the district for Sanford, Florida, the town where he was living.

Personal life and death
On June 15, 1937, Lad married Katharine Pfeiffer.

On July 11, 1960, D.M. Ladd died in an automobile accident in Sanford, Florida; his wife survived the crash with injuries.

Legacy

At time of death, the Washington Evening Star wrote:  "Mr. Ladd never liked to talk about cases in which he participated.  Although it was known that he had taken significant roles in the capture many of the leading gangsters in the '30s, he said on his retirement, 'I dn't approve of people who go out and write books'."

In 1998, the CIA released a report that in 1968 Izvestia published an interview with Soviet spy Kim Philby, who states that Ladd had made an "indelible impression" on Philby due to Ladd's conviction that Franklin Delano Roosevelt was a Comintern agent."

See also
Other contemporary FBI colleagues include:  
 Edward Allen Tamm
 J. Edgar Hoover
 Clyde Tolson
 William C. Sullivan
 Louis J. Russell
 Alvin Williams Stokes
 Jacob Spolansky

References

External links
The Ernie Lazar FOIA documents contains several collections on Ladd:
 FBI Employees: Ladd, D. Milton-1
 FBI Employee FOIA Requests
The FBI Vault has a file on Ladd:
 FBI Vault - D. Milton Ladd Part 1 of 1

1903 births
1960 deaths
Detectives
Federal Bureau of Investigation agents
People from Fargo, North Dakota
People from Washington, D.C.